Robert Bryden (1865–1939) was a Scots artist and sculptor.

Bryden was born in Coylton in South Ayrshire, Scotland.  After a period working in the office of Hunter & Morris, architects in Ayr, he moved to London where he stayed for fifteen years studying, at the RSA and the Royal Academy, making a living from commissions and teaching art.

He had a large output, working as a painter, engraver and sculptor. Among his works are bronze portraits of William Wallace and Robert the Bruce in Ayr Town Hall. he also specialised in carved wooded figures, a collection of which are to be found at Rozelle House Galleries, a museum of art, in Ayrshire. Bryden is also responsible for the Coylton War Memorial.

In 1899 he was granted the title of Royal Engraver.  He published three volumes of etchings illustrating castles in the County of Ayrshire.

References

External links
 Robert Bryden at Future Museum, Ayrshire, South-West Scotland
 Robert Bryden is also the name of a character in the novel The Red Knight by Francis Brett Young

1865 births
1939 deaths
19th-century engravers
20th-century engravers
Scottish engravers
19th-century Scottish painters
Scottish male painters
20th-century Scottish painters
Scottish sculptors
Scottish male sculptors
20th-century British sculptors
19th-century British sculptors
20th-century British printmakers
19th-century Scottish male artists
20th-century Scottish male artists